is a Japanese football player.

Playing career
Nishiyama was born in Kanagawa Prefecture on August 24, 1999. He joined J1 League club Yokohama F. Marinos from youth team in 2018.

Club statistics
Updated to May 18, 2019.

References

External links

1999 births
Living people
Association football people from Kanagawa Prefecture
Japanese footballers
J1 League players
Yokohama F. Marinos players
ReinMeer Aomori players
Association football defenders